Doug Katsaros is an American keyboardist, arranger, composer, and conductor.

Biography 

In 1978 he played on Paul Stanley's debut album, followed by working on albums by Richie Havens, Michael Bolton, Arc Angel, Bon Jovi and his band Balance featuring Bob Kulick and Chuck Burgi. He also contributed music to the musicals Diamonds and A... My Name Is Alice. He also composed the opening theme for the TV series The Tick and Bucky O'Hare and the Toad Wars, as well as music for the movie Who Do I Gotta Kill? starring Sandra Bullock.

Katsaros has worked with some of the biggest names in music history such as Cher, Rod Stewart, Sinéad O'Connor, Gloria Estefan, Judy Collins, Elton John, Aerosmith, Marlo Thomas, Sarah Jessica Parker, Robin Beck, Shania Twain, B.B. King, Diane Schuur, Liza Minnelli, Todd Rundgren, Tim Rice, Russ Irwin, Peter Frampton, Alejandro Fernández, Christina Aguilera, as well as Peter, Paul and Mary. His jingle for Mennen was featured in every television commercial for their products.

Together with Richie Kotzen, Billy Sheehan, Dee Snider, Glenn Hughes, Devin Townsend, Geoff Tate, Bob Kulick and others he recorded the album "Sin-Atra" (2011).

Awards 

 1984: Emmy Award - ABC Afterschool Specials for Outstanding Music Composition in Children's Programming (Nomination)
 2005: Drama Desk Award - Altar Boyz (Nomination)
 2012: Emmy Award - The 85th Anniversary of the Macy's Thanksgiving Day Parade for Outstanding Original Song (Won)

Discography 
 1978 - Kiss - Paul Stanley
 1980 - Rex Smith - Forever, Rex Smith
 1980 - Richie Havens - Connections
 1983 - Michael Bolton - Michael Bolton
 1983 - Arc Angel - Arc Angel
 1984 - Bon Jovi - Bon Jovi
 1985 - Michael Bolton - Everybody's Crazy
 1987 - Cher - Cher
 1990 - Judy Collins - Fires of Eden
 1991 - Sinéad O'Connor - Silent Night
 1991 - Russ Irwin - Russ Irwin
 1991 - Todd Rundgren - 2nd Wind
 1992 - Sinéad O'Connor - Success Has Made a Failure of Our Home
 1992 - Peter, Paul & Mary - Flowers and Stones
 1992 - Sinéad O'Connor - Am I Not your Girl?
 1993 - Gloria Estefan - Christmas Through Your Eyes
 1994 - B.B. King & Diane Schuur - Heart to Heart
 1994 - Ann Hampton Callaway - Bring Back Romance
 1995 - Cliff Eberhardt - Mona Lisa Cafe
 1995 - Peter, Paul & Mary - LifeLines
 1995 - Raúl di Blasio - Latino: Piano de America
 1996 - Peter, Paul & Mary - LifeLines Live
 1997 - Billy Stritch - Waters of March
 1997 - Raúl di Blasio - Solo
 1997 - Live - Secret Samadhi
 1999 - Georg Wadenius & Doug Katsaros - Left Turn From the Right Lane
 1999 - Tim Rice & Elton John - Aida
 2001 - Donny Osmond - This Is The Moment
 2002 - Raúl di Blasio - Tango
 2002 - Rod Stewart - It Had To Be You: The Great American Songbook
 2003 - Peter, Paul & Mary - Carry It On
 2004 - Marlo Thomas - Thanks & Giving All Year Long
 2004 - Diane Schuur - Rediscovery on GRP
 2005 - Rod Stewart - The Great American Songbook
 2006 - Raúl di Blasio - Los Exitos
 2007 - Andiamo - Love, From Italy
 2009 - Balance - Equilibrium
 2012 - Dee Snider - Dee Does Broadway
 2013 - Alejandro Fernández - Confidencias
 2017 - Bob Kulick - Skeletons In The Closet

References

External links 
 Music Of Your Dreams Official Site

20th-century American keyboardists
Living people
Year of birth missing (living people)